Alexis Godey also called Alec Godey and Alejandro Godey, born Alexander Godey, was a trapper, scout, and mountain man. He was an associate of Jim Bridger and was lead scout for John C. Frémont.

Biography 

Godey was born in 1818 in St. Louis, Missouri. Although little is known about his early life, it is suspected that he was born in a French immigrant family from Canada. Godey's home at 414 19th Street West in Bakersfield, California is California Historical Landmark number 690. He sustained a long friendship with Jim Bridger, a fellow scout and mountain man.

Career 
Godey's reputation as a scout led him to be hired by explorer and military officer John C. Frémont.  Godey was the lead scout for Frémont's second (1843–1844), third (1845), and fourth (1848–1849) California expeditions. Frémont wrote that Godey had been key for the success of his expeditions. Godey was instrumental in navigating the Kings River and San Joaquin Valley. This was especially important during the Conquest of California and the Bear Flag Rebellion.

Bravery 
On Frémont's fourth expedition in 1843, Godey could show his skill and bravery again. On the Mojave Desert Spanish Trail, Godey and Kit Carson fought off a group of Native Americans, preventing an attack on the expedition and recovering stolen horses. He worked with Old Bill Williams on Frémont's fourth expedition.  Working with Frémont, he attained the rank of Lieutenant in the California Battalion. For a short time, Frémont put him in charge of Mission San Luis Rey. Godey spoke French, English, Spanish, and a few Native American languages.

During the Battle of San Pasqual on December 6, 1846, when the US Army was surrounded and outnumbered, Godey led a small group out of the battle and past enemy lines.

Personal life 
In 1848, Godey built a home in Bakersfield and became a miner, rancher, local guide, and Indian agent. When gold was discovered for the first time in the Kern River by a group of Native Americans, they gave this to Godey.

In 1852, Robert S. Williamson hired Godey to help the Pacific Rail Road Survey survey the land for the future Southern Pacific Railroad line that followed the 32nd parallel from Texas to California. The route followed the Gila River to the Pima villages and the Rio Grande river. He also ran a ferry in Firebaugh, California.

In 1854, Godey was the scout for Kit Carson on his last visit to Kern County.

Godey partnered shortly with Edward Fitzgerald Beale to raise sheep on his Tejon Ranch in 1855 and became the overseer of the ranch for a few years.

As an Indian agent, he was the overseer of the Sebastian Indian Reservation in 1864. Godey was the overseer for Rancho San Emidio on behalf of Frémont in 1868.

In 1870, Godey's divorce from Maria Antonia Coronel was litigated up to the California Supreme Court. Maria was the sister of Antonio F. Coronel, the fourth mayor of Los Angeles.

When the US Land Grant Commission turned down ownership of Cuyama Rancho to the Lataillade family, Godey started a cattle ranch on the land. The US Congress returned the land to the Lataillade family in 1872, so Godey moved off the land and returned to Kern.

Death 
Godey died on January 19, 1889, at the age of 70 or 71, at the Sister's Hospital Of Los Angeles, Sisters of Charity. He had been scratched by a circus lion, which he had tried to pet, and the scratch became infected. He was buried in the Union Cemetery in Bakersfield.

The California State Historical Landmark reads:

 NO. 690 SITE OF THE LAST HOME OF ALEXIS GODEY - Near this site stood the home of Alexis Godey, frontiersman, and scout, who lived here from 1883 until his death on January 19, 1889. Born in St. Louis, Missouri in 1818, he acted as a guide for John C. Frémont's expedition through the Kern area in 1843-44 and was honored for his services at the Battle of San Pasqual in 1846.

See also
 California Historical Landmarks in Kern County
California Historical Landmark

References

People of the Conquest of California
Explorers of California
1818 births
19th-century explorers
American explorers
Mountain men
American hunters
United States Indian agents
1889 deaths
American people of the Indian Wars
American people of the Mexican–American War